All For Love (Spanish: Amar y vivir) is a Colombian telenovela produced by Fox Telecolombia that premiered on 7 January 2020 on Caracol Televisión, and ended on 14 April 2020. The series is created by Nubia Barreto based on the 1988 telenovela of the same name written by Germán Escallón and Carlos Duplat. It stars Ana María Estupiñán, and Carlos Torres. The video streaming service Netflix acquired the series for the distribution on worldwide. Unlike its original broadcast, Netflix shows a total of 69 episodes.

Plot 
Irene (Ana María Estupiñán), the leading voice of the Los Milagrosos group in the market place, meets the mechanic Joaquín (Carlos Torres) when he arrives in the city with just what he is wearing. They cross their destinies while fighting for their dreams, and they will soon realize that they cannot live without each other, even though their struggle to be together will be intense and painful.

Cast

Main 

 Carlos Torres as Joaquín Herrera
 Ana María Estupiñán as Irene Romero
 Yuri Vargas as Rocío Galindo
 Jim Muñoz as Diego Portilla
 Julio Sánchez Cóccaro as Salvador Romero
 Alina Lozano as Magola de Romero
 Valeria Galvis as Alba Lucía Herrera
 Juan Millán as Bryan Portilla
 Juana del Río as Celeste Villamarín "La Chacha"
 Mario Duarte as Delio Villamizar
 Alex Páez as Humberto
 Isabel Gaona
 Vilma Vera as Elena
 Ivonne Gómez as Jenifer Solano
 Germán De Greiff as Michael
 Pedro Mogollón as Lubián Portilla
 Sandra Guzmán as Brighitte
 Lina Nieto as Yuri
 Jairo Ordóñez as Etilio Cuellar
 Alden Rojas as Peluche
 Xilena Aycardi as Julia Linero
 Camila Jiménez as Coronel Molina
 Gustavo Monsalve as Agente Padilla

Guest stars 
 Paola Jara as Herself
 Franklin Gutierrez as a Judge of shows

Television rating

Music 

The first soundtrack of the series, titled Amar y vivir, was released on 7 January 2020.

References 

Colombian telenovelas
2020 telenovelas
Spanish-language telenovelas
Caracol Televisión telenovelas
2020 Colombian television series debuts
2020 Colombian television series endings
Spanish-language Netflix original programming
Television shows set in Bogotá